1407 Lindelöf, provisional designation , is an asteroid from the central region of the asteroid belt, approximately 20 kilometers in diameter. It was discovered on 21 November 1936, by Finnish astronomer Yrjö Väisälä at Turku Observatory in Southwest Finland. The asteroid was named after Finnish topologist Ernst Lindelöf.

Orbit and classification 

Lindelöf orbits the Sun in the central main-belt at a distance of 2.0–3.5 AU once every 4 years and 7 months (1,680 days). Its orbit has an eccentricity of 0.28 and an inclination of 6° with respect to the ecliptic.

Physical characteristics 

In the SMASS taxonomy, Lindelöfs spectral class is that of an X-type asteroid, while the Collaborative Asteroid Lightcurve Link (CALL) considers it to be of a stony composition.

Rotation period and poles 

French amateur astronomer Pierre Antonini obtained a rotational lightcurve of Lindelöf from photometric observations in January 2006. Lightcurve analysis gave a well-defined and longer-than average rotation period of 31.151 hours with a brightness variation of 0.34 in magnitude.

A 2016-published lightcurve, using modeled photometric data from the Lowell Photometric Database (LPD), gave a concurring period of 31.0941 hours, as well as a spin axis of (147.0°, 36°) in ecliptic coordinates (λ, β).

Diameter and albedo 

According to the surveys carried out by the Infrared Astronomical Satellite IRAS, the Japanese Akari satellite, and NASA's Wide-field Infrared Survey Explorer with its subsequent NEOWISE mission, Lindelöf measures between 17.39 and 23.85 kilometers in diameter, and its surface has an albedo between and 0.179 and 0.28. The Collaborative Asteroid Lightcurve Link derives an albedo of 0.1791 and a diameter of 20.75 kilometers, with an absolute magnitude of 10.9.

Naming 

This minor planet was named for Finnish topologist Ernst Leonard Lindelöf (1870–1946), who was a professor of mathematics at Helsinki University. The Lindelöf spaces are also named after him. The official naming citation was mentioned in The Names of the Minor Planets by Paul Herget in 1955.

References

External links 
 Asteroid Lightcurve Database (LCDB), query form (info )
 Dictionary of Minor Planet Names, Google books
 Asteroids and comets rotation curves, CdR – Observatoire de Genève, Raoul Behrend
 Discovery Circumstances: Numbered Minor Planets (1)-(5000) – Minor Planet Center
 
 

 

001407
Discoveries by Yrjö Väisälä
Named minor planets
001407
19361121